The 6P29 and 6P30 (GRAU Indices), commonly known as the VSS "Thread Cutter" (Russian: ВСС «Винторе́з» Винто́вка Сна́йперская Специа́льная, romanized: Vintóvka Snáyperskaya Spetsiálnaya "Vintorez", lit. 'Special "Sniper" Rifle) and AS "Shaft" (Russian: АС «Вал»; Автома́т Специа́льный, romanized: Avtomát Spetsiálny "Val", lit. 'Special Automatic'), respectively, were a series of Soviet-designed rifles featuring an integral suppressor based on the prototype RG-036 completed in 1981 by TsNIITochMash. The two rifles hereafter are referred to as the Vintorez and Val. The Vintorez (beginning in 1983) and Val (beginning in 1985) were developed by TsNIITochMash to replace modified general-purpose firearms, such as the AKS-74UB, BS-1, APB, and PB, for clandestine operations, much like the PSS Vul. Manufacturing began at the Tula Arms Plant after its adoption by the Armed Forces of the Soviet Union in 1987.

Design 
The Vintorez and Val are integrally suppressed and chambered in 9×39mm, a subsonic cartridge, in order to reduce its report. Four rows of nine holes are drilled in the barrel which follow the rifling and allows gas to escape the barrel behind the projectile into the expansion chamber which surrounds the barrel and extends ~20 cm forward of the end of the barrel where three baffles are located. The baffles are stamped out of a single sheet ~1 mm thickness and welded to a removable frame which is pressed against the front of the suppressor housing by a spring placed between the baffle assembly and the end of the barrel. The suppressor effectively reduces muzzle flash and muzzle report of the firearm to 130 dB. There are no design features which reduce the noise of the action.

Manipulation is similar to many AK-type rifles: charging handle on the right side, tangent rear sight, magazine release button behind the magazine well, and safety lever above the trigger guard. The fire selector is, however, located behind the trigger within the trigger guard. The rifle also has an "AK-type" Warsaw Pact rail for various optical sights, namely the PSO-1-1, PSO-1M2-1, and 1-PN-51 calibrated for use with the 9x39mm cartridge. The standard open sights are graduated from 100 to 425 m in 25 m increments.

The action is also similar to that of AK-type rifles with a similar long-stroke gas system with the piston located above the barrel. However, the design characteristically uses a rotating bolt with six locking lugs and a milled steel receiver. The Vintorez and Val share the same standard 10 or 20-round double-stack detachable box magazines and are compatible with the 30-round magazine of the SR-3M. Many of the components are shared between the Vintorez and Val with the main discrepancy being the fixed wooden buttstock on the Vintorez and tubular metal buttstock which folds to the left on the Val. The Val is functional with the stock folded but the mounting of an optic will not allow the buttstock to close completely (like many other rifles with similar mounting solutions for optics). The handguard, pistol grip (Val only), and magazines are made of a synthetic polymer.

Both rifles can be disassembled to fit into a special compact case for transportation.

Variants and derivatives 

 The SR-3 "Whirlwind" (Russian: СР-3 «Вихрь», romanized: Spetsialnaya Razrabotka "Vikhr", lit. 'Special Development') was designed for improved concealability by replacing the stock and omitting the integral suppressor and charging handle. The design process began in 1989, manufacturing began in 1994, and the rifle was adopted in 1996.
 The SR-3M is a modernization of the SR-3 that replaces the original SR-3 stock with one similar to the AS Val and introduced a new 30-round backwards compatible magazine. The handguard was also redesigned to include the rear sight and a folding foregrip.
 The SR-3MP is a further modernization which allows for the folding stock to be mounted at the base of the pistol grip for users wearing helmets with face shields or head-mounted night vision devices. The handguard was also redesigned to include two picatinny rails on the sides.
 The 9A-91 and VSK-94 (Russian: ВСК-94 Войсковой Снайперский Комплекс, romanized: Voyskovoy Snayperskiy Kompleks, lit. 'Military Sniper Complex') are cost-reducing redesigns of the two rifles by the KBP Instrument Design Bureau completed in 1992 which also omit the integrated suppressor. Manufacturing began in 1994.
 VSSM and ASM (6P29M/6P30M) are modernizations where the VSSM is equipped with an aluminum buttstock with an adjustable cheek and butt pad and a new 30-round magazine was introduced to be intended for use with the ASM. Both rifles are also outfitted with a Picatinny rail on the top of the dust cover and on the sides and bottom of the suppressor, forward of the handguard. The mounts which shroud the suppressor can be removed. Deliveries began in 2018.

Users 

 : a small quantity of weapons were received from Russia among other arms before 2014.
 : Used by various special forces.
 : Used by MARCOS
 : used by army and police special forces, some configured with Aimpoint and Kobra red dot sights.
 : Special forces, Federal Security Service (FSB) and OMON.
 : Used by SBU Alpha Group.

Former users

See also 

 AMB-17 
 OTs-14 Groza

References 

9×39mm firearms
Rifles of Russia